Oliver "Ollie" Lang is an American professional paintball player, who by the age of 22 in 2005, had already been awarded the International Paintball Player of the Year award.  Paintballer Matt Marshall has stated that Lang “wins so frequently, plays our sport so instinctually, and gobbles up life on the road at such a frantic and furious pace.”

Professional paintball career
Lang has played with various teams over his career, including the Ironkids.  In 2002, Lang joined childhood friends Alex Fraige, Todd Martinez, Ryan Greenspan, Brian Cole, Brad Maughan, and Angel Fragoza in the year old San Diego Dynasty team. He then left Dynasty in 2006 to re-join the Los Angeles Ironmen, making paintball history when he was paid $100,000 to do so by Dye Action Sports.

In 2011 Oliver Lang rejoined San Diego Dynasty. They went on to win the first Paintball Sports Promotions (PSP) event of 2011, the 2011 PSP Galveston Island Open, defeating Boston Red Legion (more widely known as Russian Legion) 7-2 in the finals, a team who had won the past two events.

After winning PSP Texas in 2011, Oliver led San Diego Dynasty to a first-place finish in Paris, at the first Millennium Series event. In April 2011, San Diego Dynasty won the first NPPL event at Huntington Beach, this win secured team Dynasty's 50th professional win. After the win at Huntington Beach, Dynasty has now won nearly one-third of all the professional paintball events ever played.

Lang also played in the CXBL in Canada on the team Scarborough Hustle. Splat magazine rated him the best paintball player of the world.

References

External links
 Ollie Lang's personal website
 Dynasty Paintball Team Website
 Dynasty Paintball Team Website
 Highest-Paid Paintball Player

Paintball players